Peter O'Donnellan  was a long serving Irish prelate who served as Bishop of Clonfert for over forty years.

He was selected as Clonfert on 3 August 1733, and confirmed on the 11 August that year. He died on 7 May 1778 aged 100.

References

Roman Catholic bishops of Clonfert
18th-century Roman Catholic bishops in Ireland
1778 deaths
People from County Galway
Irish centenarians
Men centenarians